Kalbi Bak (also Romanized as Kalbī Bak and Kal Bībak; also known as Kalbībag and Kalbībeyg) is a village in Emamzadeh Hamzeh Ali Rural District of Boldaji District, Borujen County, Chaharmahal and Bakhtiari province, Iran. At the 2006 census, its population was 874 in 198 households. The following census in 2011 counted 889 people in 249 households. The latest census in 2016 showed a population of 838 people in 252 households; it was the largest village in its rural district. The village is populated by Lurs.

References 

Borujen County

Populated places in Chaharmahal and Bakhtiari Province

Populated places in Borujen County
Luri settlements in Chaharmahal and Bakhtiari Province